Cross-country skiing at the 2019 European Youth Olympic Winter Festival was held from 11 to 15 February at Veliko polje, Igman, Bosnia and Herzegovina.

Competition schedule

Medal summary

Medal table

Boys' events

Girls' events

Team event

References 

 
2019
European Youth Olympic Winter Festival
2019 European Youth Olympic Winter Festival events